Sofia Larsson (born 22 July 1988) is Swedish athlete specialising in the discus throw. She represented her country at the 2009 World Championships without qualifying for the final. Early in her career she competed in the 100 metres hurdles.

Her personal best in the event is 59.25 metres set in Södertälje in 2015.

International competitions

References

1988 births
Living people
Swedish female discus throwers
World Athletics Championships athletes for Sweden